Kamal Singh (born 3 April 1955) is a Guyanese cricketer. He played in nine first-class and seven List A matches for Guyana from 1980 to 1984.

See also
 List of Guyanese representative cricketers

References

External links
 

1955 births
Living people
Guyanese cricketers
Guyana cricketers